James Daniel "Red" Smyth (January 30, 1893 – April 14, 1958) was an outfielder in Major League Baseball from 1915 to 1918 with the Brooklyn Robins and St. Louis Cardinals.

References

External links

1893 births
1958 deaths
Major League Baseball outfielders
Brooklyn Robins players
St. Louis Cardinals players
Baseball players from Mississippi
Minor league baseball managers
Fort Wayne Railroaders players
Fort Wayne Cubs players
Montreal Royals players
Milwaukee Brewers (minor league) players